Nelson David Vivas (born 18 October 1969) is an Argentine former professional footballer and manager who played as a right-back. Vivas featured for clubs Quilmes, Boca Juniors, Lugano, Arsenal, Celta de Vigo, Internazionale and River Plate. He also played for the Argentina national team. Vivas has gone on to manage sides Quilmes, Estudiantes and Defensa y Justicia.

Club career

Career in Argentina
Vivas was born in Granadero Baigorria, Santa Fe, Argentina. He began his professional footballing career with Quilmes. After three years with Quilmes, he then joined Boca Juniors. Vivas in all played 98 games and scored three goals for Azul y Oro.

Move to Europe
Vivas then made his move to Europe, joining FC Lugano of the Swiss League on loan. He went on to make 10 appearances during his stay at the club. Arsenal eventually signed him up from Boca Juniors for £1,600,000 in August 1998.

Vivas was at first used as backup for established full-backs Lee Dixon and Nigel Winterburn while at Arsenal. He started 18 games and played as a substitute for another 18 matches during his debut season at Highbury. Vivas scored his first and only goal for the Gunners against Derby County in the League Cup. He had a setback when he missed a penalty in a shootout as Arsenal crashed out of the 1999/2000 League Cup to Middlesbrough.

Vivas was loaned out to the La Liga outfit Celta Vigo halfway through the 1999–00 season. As Arsenal had signed Oleh Luzhnyi and Sylvinho in the summer of 1999, he went on to mainly appear as a substitute at the club. With him being unable to attain regular playing time, Vivas left Arsenal at the end of the 2000–01 season. Altogether he played 69 games for Arsenal with 40 as a substitute, scoring one goal. Vivas then joined Serie A team Internazionale in a free transfer. At Inter, Vivas found it hard to break into the first team. After two seasons with the Nerazzurri, he left European football to return to his native Argentina.

Early retirement
He went on to sign up for River Plate where he spent a solitary season. Vivas then made a return to Quilmes where he brought an end to his playing days in 2005.

Vivas served as Diego Simeone's assistant manager at clubs Estudiantes de La Plata, River Plate and San Lorenzo.

For the 2013–14 season Vivas once again returned to Quilmes, as manager on this occasion. International headlines were made in October 2013 when Vivas attacked a fan in the stands and subsequently resigned from his post.

International career
As a solid defender, Vivas was always a regular for the Argentina national football team. He went on to play for La Albiceleste at the 1995 and 1997 Copa America together with the 1998 World Cup. Vivas  played 39 games and scored on one occasion for Argentina altogether.

Career statistics

International

Honours

Player
Arsenal
FA Charity Shield: 1998

River Plate
Primera A: 2003

Manager
Argentina Manager of the Year: 2017

References

External links

Profile at premierlague.com

1969 births
Living people
People from Rosario Department
Argentine people of Spanish descent
Association football defenders
Argentine footballers
Quilmes Atlético Club footballers
Boca Juniors footballers
FC Lugano players
Arsenal F.C. players
Inter Milan players
Club Atlético River Plate footballers
La Liga players
RC Celta de Vigo players
1998 FIFA World Cup players
1995 King Fahd Cup players
1997 Copa América players
1999 Copa América players
Swiss Super League players
Premier League players
Serie A players
Argentina international footballers
Argentine expatriate footballers
Expatriate footballers in England
Expatriate footballers in Spain
Expatriate footballers in Switzerland
Expatriate footballers in Italy
Argentine expatriate sportspeople in Italy
Argentine expatriate sportspeople in Spain
Argentine expatriate sportspeople in England
Argentine Primera División players
Defensa y Justicia managers
Estudiantes de La Plata managers
Argentine football managers
Sportspeople from Santa Fe Province